Libi may refer to:

People
 Libi (name), Jewish given name
 Al Libi, Arabic surname
 Abd al-Muhsin Al-Libi (born 1966), Islamic terrorist
 Abdullah Said al Libi, Islamic terrorist
 Abu Anas al-Libi, Islamic terrorist
 Abu Faraj al-Libbi, Islamic terrorist
 Abu Habib al-Libi, Islamic terrorist
 Abu Laith al-Libi (1967–2008), Islamic terrorist
 Abu Yahya al-Libi (1963-2012), Islamic terrorist
 Ibn al-Shaykh al-Libi, Islamic terrorist
 Katiba al-Bittar al-Libi, Islamic terrorist
 Libi Haim (born 1984), Israeli volleyball player
 Libi Staiger, American actress
 Luqman al-Libi, Islamic terrorist
 Ben Ali Libi, also known as Michel Velleman, Dutch magician

Places
 Libi, Chongqing, China
 Libi, Logone Oriental (region), Chad
 Libi, Malapatan, Philippines
 Libi, North Region (Cameroon)
 Libi, Ombella-M'Poko, Central African Republic
 Libi, Orientale Province, Democratic Republic of Congo
 Libi, South Region (Cameroon)
 Libi, Woleu-Ntem Province, Gabon